Nouran El Torky, (born November 7, 1992, in Alexandria) is a professional squash player who represents Egypt. She reached a career-high world ranking of World No. 41 in January 2015.
Her older sister Heba is also a professional squash player.

References

External links 

Egyptian female squash players
Living people
1992 births
Sportspeople from Alexandria